Richard John Bates (born 2 March 1972) is a former English cricketer.  Bates was a left-handed batsman who bowled slow left-arm orthodox.  He was born at Chippenham, Wiltshire.

Bates made his Minor Counties Championship debut for Wiltshire against Cheshire in 1997.  From 1997 to 2004, he represented the county in 48 Minor Counties Championship matches, the last of which came against Cornwall.  Bates also represented Wiltshire in the MCCA Knockout Trophy.  His debut in that competition came against Norfolk in 1997.  From 1997 to 2004, he represented Wiltshire in 19 Trophy matches, the last of which came against Northumberland.

Bates also represented Wiltshire in List-A cricket.  His List-A debut for the county came against the Northamptonshire Cricket Board in the 1999 NatWest Trophy.  From 1999 to 2005, he represented the county in 9 matches, the last of which came against Kent in the 2005 Cheltenham & Gloucester Trophy.  In his 9 List-A matches, he scored 101 runs at a batting average of 12.62, with a high score of 24.  With the ball he took 11 wickets at a bowling average of 34.36, with best figures of 3/16.

Family
His brother Paul has also represented Wiltshire in List-A and Minor Counties cricket.

References

External links
Richard Bates at Cricinfo
Richard Bates at CricketArchive

1972 births
Living people
People from Chippenham
People from Wiltshire
English cricketers
Wiltshire cricketers